Symphoricarpos hesperius, called the trailing snowberry or creeping snowberry, is a North American species of trailing shrubs in the honeysuckle family. It is native to southwestern Canada (southwestern British Columbia) and the northwestern United States (Oregon, Washington, Idaho, and far northern California)

Symphoricarpos hesperius has pink flowers and white fruits.

References

External links

hesperius
Flora of British Columbia
Flora of the Northwestern United States
Plants described in 1940
Bird food plants
Flora without expected TNC conservation status